Anabta is a Palestinian town in the Tulkarm Governorate in the northern West Bank, located 9 kilometers east of Tulkarm. According to the Palestinian Central Bureau of Statistics, Anabta had a population of 7,329 inhabitants in 2007. Anabta is administered by a municipal council and is one of the oldest municipalities in the Tulkarm Governorate.

Etymology
The name is derived from the word Enabta, which meant "grape" or "berry" in Aramaic and Syriac. Many grape presses have been found in the hills around the village.

History

Roman and Byzantine era
Sherds from the Hellenistic, early and late Roman and the Byzantine eras have been found here.

During Roman and Byzantine rule, Anabta was a Samaritan village. A tradition connects the village with Dositheos, a Samaritan religious leader possibly active during the 1st-century CE. The Samaritan chronicler Abu l-Fath (14th century) mentions that Dositheos died of starvation after going to 'Anbata where he hid in a cave, fasting in an effort to gain wisdom. Some olive trees still existing in Anabta are said to date back to Roman times.

According to the PEF's Survey of Western Palestine, the site appeared "ancient", and rock-cut tombs and a tank of good masonry had been found.

Pottery sherds from the early Muslim and Medieval eras have also been found here.

Mamluk and Ottoman eras
During the reign of Mamluk Sultan Baibars al-Bunduqdari in the 13th century, Anabta served as a central staging point from which to supply the Muslim armies fighting Crusader and Mongol incursions. The location was chosen because it was considered relatively easy to protect as the area is nestled between two large hills.

During Ottoman rule, Anabta was listed in the 1596 Ottoman tax register as being in the Nahiya of Jabal Sami of the Liwa of Nablus. It had a population of 55 Muslim households who paid a fixed tax rate of 33,3% on wheat, barley, summer crops, olives, goats or beehives, and presses for grapes or olives; a total of 13,757 akçe.

In 1852, the American scholar Edward Robinson visited the village. He described it as "large and well built", with two watermills by the stream. There were many camels there, as the village was on the main route for camels from Nablus to Ramleh. In 1882, the PEF's Survey of Western Palestine described it as a village of moderate size, in the valley, with olives around it. It also had a mill. A portion of the Hejaz Railway used to run through the centre of the town, parallel to the main street.

British Mandate era

The first local council in Anabta was established in 1922 during the mandate period. In the 1936 Anabta shooting, on the night of April 15, 1936, a prelude to the 1936–39 Arab revolt in Palestine, about 20 vehicles traveling on the road outside Anabta were stopped at a road block constructed for the purpose by armed villagers, and forced to hand over weapons and cash. 3 Jewish drivers were separated from the non-Jewish drivers and shot, 2 died of their injuries, the third survived. In June, an attack by Arab irregulars on a civilian bus convoy escalated into the Battle of Anabta, a brief but intense fight between Arab militants and the British army involving air attacks on the Arab fighters. On October 12, 1936, when the rebellion stopped, the Daily Telegraph reporter described the village during his visit to it, he said: "Anabta, the scene of several encounters between British troops and Arabs, was the only place through which I passed where the inhabitants showed truculence".

Jordanian era
In the wake of the 1948 Arab–Israeli War, and after the 1949 Armistice Agreements, Anabta came under Jordanian rule.

In 1954, Anabta became a municipal council.

In 1961, the population of Anabta was 4,018.

Post-1967
Since the Six-Day War in 1967, Anabta has been under Israeli occupation. Shortly after the war, Anabta underwent major development and achieved local council status. According to Israel's Ministry of Defense, the village was connected to the Israeli electric grid. Anabta lies on the edge of the Tulkarm district's Area A, a Palestinian enclave, which means the city became under full security and civil jurisdiction of the Palestinian National Authority.

Geography
Anabta is located 19 kilometers west of Nablus and 9 kilometers east of Tulkarm. The town is bordered to the north by the village of Kafr Rumman, the south by the town of Kafr al-Labad, the east by the village of Ramin and the northwest by the town of Bal'a. The city is elevated 150 meters above sea level. Surrounded by hills on all sides, a small valley that runs through the center of the town. The town has an urban area of about 1,300 dunams. Most of its exterior lands are planted with olives, figs and almonds or covered by forests. Water is provided by five underground wells, with distribution supervised by the town's municipality. The Israeli settlement Einav is located southeast of the city and an Israeli checkpoint is positioned at the eastern entrance of the town.

Demographics
By an 1870 visitor, the population was estimated at 1,800. At the time of the 1922 census of Palestine, Anabta had a population of 1,606 Muslims. In the 1931 census of Palestine, the combined population of Anabta, Iktaba and Nur ash Shams was 2498; 2,457 Muslims, 34 Christians and 1 Druze living in 502 houses. In 1945, the combined population of Anabta and Iktaba was 3,120. Between 1922 and 1947, the population increased by 110%.

In 1967, the population was 3,400, rising to 5,700 by 1987 and 8,300 by 2009.

Residents of Anabta belong to two large clans, 'Amr and Al-Jetawi. These families are then divided into smaller families. Anabta also contains a significant population of Palestinians from Gaza who are not classified among the families.

Education
The town has two high schools and four elementary schools that are maintained and funded by the Palestinian Authority Ministry of Education.

Health care
The St John of Jerusalem Eye Hospital Group operates a clinic in Anabta envisaged as a centre for the treatment of diabetic retinopathy in the northern West Bank.

Notable residents, or people from Anabta
 Rami Hamdallah, Palestinian prime minister and president of An-Najah National University
 Ibrahim Nassar, Palestinian political and Commander in 1936–39 Arab revolt in Palestine
 Samiha Khalil, former Palestinian presidential candidate
 Anwar Hamed, novelist, poet and author
Marwan Awartani, Minister of Education and Higher Education

References

Bibliography

External links
Anabta Municipality
Anabta & Iktaba - Palestine Remembered Entry
Anabta, Welcome to Palestine
Survey of Western Palestine, Map 11:  IAA, Wikimedia commons

Tulkarm Governorate
Towns in the West Bank
Ancient Jewish settlements of Samaria
Municipalities of the State of Palestine
Ancient Samaritan settlements